A distinctive type of Ottoman tower houses (all meaning "tower", from Arabic  (“fort, fortress”) via Persian , meaning "mountain" or "top", and Turkish ) developed and were built in the Balkans (Albania, Bosnia and Herzegovina, Montenegro, Bulgaria, Greece, Kosovo, Macedonia and Serbia), as well as in Oltenia, in Romania, after the Ottoman conquest in the Middle Ages by both Christian and Muslim communities. The practice began during the decline of Ottoman power in the 17th century and flourished until the early 20th century. The tower houses were typically made out of stone, rose three or four storeys, and were square or rectangular in shape. They served both military (defence, watchtower) and civilian (residential) purposes in order to protect the extended family.

In Albania

Types of towerhouses in Albanian architecture existed before the Ottoman invasion of the Balkans, especially in Gjirokastër. Albanian kullë are predominantly found in the north of the country, with notable instances in the south being Berat, Gjirokastër, Himara, and Këlcyrë. Kullas are heavily fortified buildings with small windows and shooting holes, because their main purpose was to offer security in a fighting situation. The first kullas that were built are from the 17th century, a time when there was continuous fighting in the Dukagjini region, although most of the ones that still remain are from the 18th or 19th century. They are almost always built within a complex of buildings with various functions, but kullas in towns exist mostly as standalone structures. They are also positioned within the complex of buildings that they exist in a way that makes it possible for the inhabitants to survey the surrounding area. Kullas in towns are usually built as standalone structures, while in villages they are more commonly found as a part of a larger ensemble of kullas and stone houses, usually grouped based on the family clan they belonged to.

Certain kullë were used as places of isolation and safe havens, or "locked towers", intended for the use of persons targeted by blood feuds (gjakmarrja). An example can be found in Theth, northern Albania. 

There are also instances of fortified tower-houses in Gjirokastër built in the 13th century, pre-dating Ottoman conquest.

In Bulgaria

Examples of fortified residential towers in Bulgarian lands include the 16th-century Tower of the Meshchii (converted into a clock tower in the 19th century) and the 17th-century Kurtpashov Tower in Vratsa in Bulgaria's northwest. The Pirgova (Pirkova) Tower, similar in purpose but different in design, was built in the southwestern town of Kyustendil in the 14th or 15th century.

The tower in Teshovo in south Pirin, noted for its relatively sophisticated water conduit and sewage system, is also thought to date to the early Ottoman rule of Bulgaria and may well have been the residence of a local bey.

Hrelyo's Tower, built in 1334–5 by prōtosebastos Hrelja in the courtyard of the Rila Monastery, is a pre-Ottoman example of an autonomous tower that served residential as well as defensive purposes. Besides featuring habitable floors, the  Hrelyo's Tower also includes an Orthodox chapel on its top floor.

In Greece

The tradition of towerhouses in Greek architecture existed since Byzantine and Frankish times.

Although the Ottoman-period architecture has almost completely disappeared from Greek urban centres, there are scattered examples of tower houses built in Ottoman Greece and during the chifliks.

Alongside the fortified houses of Mani (called xemonia), there are also residential towers (koule) of Ottoman origin.

Greek architects have claimed that the Albanian tower houses developed under Greek influence.

In Kosovo

In Kosovo the traditional two- or three-storey kullas were built mainly between the 18th century and the early part of the 20th century. They are constructed entirely of locally excavated stone, though some incorporate decorative wooden elements in the upper floors. Historically the kullas have been inhabited solely by men, with women and children housed in a connected annexe. The exterior walls are a meter thick at ground level but become thinner towards the roof. The small openings that play the role of windows are called frëngji, and their tiny size is due to the kulla's historical use as a fortification and as a means of protection against attacks.

Aspects of kulla life are strongly influenced by Muslim culture, especially the segregation between men and women in social spaces and entrances. The kullas' characteristic double sets of entrances and staircases (main and side) reflect this division, since only the side entrance and staircase lead to the private family quarters. Kullas are also well-suited to the Kosovan climate as their construction allows them to remain cool in the summer and warm during winter.

Examples include Jashar Pasha's Tower, Haxhi Zeka's Tower, Xhafer Syla's Tower, Mazrekaj Tower, Janjevo Tower, Tomić's Tower.
Osdautaj's Tower (kulla).https://mapio.net/pic/p-17571109/

In Serbia

Nenadović's Tower was built by Jakov Nenadović in springtime 1813 in Valjevo, Šumadija. Initially it was used by rebels during the First Serbian Uprising of the Serbian Revolution for military purposes. Ottomans later used it as prison.

In Montenegro
Ganić tower house, in Rožaje.

See also
 Culă, towers built by boyars in what is today Romania.
 Architecture of Kosovo
 Architecture of Serbia
 Architecture of Montenegro
 Architecture of Albania

Annotations

References

Sources

Stone houses
Balkans
Buildings and structures of the Ottoman Empire
Architecture in Albania
Architecture in Bulgaria
Architecture in Greece
Architecture in Serbia
Balkan culture

Towers in Greece
House styles